Gunnar Berg (13 September 1923 – 23 December 2007) was a Norwegian politician for the Liberal Party.

He served as a deputy representative to the Norwegian Parliament from Nordland during the term 1965–1969.

References

1923 births
2007 deaths
Liberal Party (Norway) politicians
Deputy members of the Storting
Nordland politicians